is a subway station on the Tsurumai Line in Kawanayama-chō, Shōwa-ku,  Nagoya, Aichi Prefecture, Japan, operated by the Nagoya Municipal Subway operator Transportation Bureau City of Nagoya.

Lines
Kawana Station is served by the Tsurumai Line, and is numbered "T13". It is located 13.1 kilometers from the starting point of the line at Kami-Otai Station.

Layout
Kawana Station has two underground opposed side platforms.

Platforms

On Platform 1 for Akaike, door 16 is closest to the elevator, and on Platform 2 for Fushimi and Kami-Otai, door 18 is closest to the elevator.

History
Kawana Station was opened on 18 March 1977.

Passenger statistics
In fiscal 2007, the station was used by an average of 9,521 passengers daily.

See also
 List of railway stations in Japan

References

External links

  

Railway stations in Japan opened in 1977
Stations of Nagoya Municipal Subway